André Bettencourt (21 April 1919 – 19 November 2007) was a French politician. He was awarded the Croix de Guerre, and was a Chevalier of the Legion of Honor. He had been a member of La Cagoule, a violent French fascist-leaning and anti-communist group, before and into the Second World War; he then joined the anti-German Resistance late in the war. His earlier affiliation was not known when he later served as a cabinet minister under presidents Pierre Mendès France and Charles de Gaulle, and was awarded for his bravery in the Resistance against the Nazis.

Biography
He was born in Saint-Maurice-d'Ételan (Seine-Maritime) in an old Catholic Norman noble family.

Bettencourt served in several posts in the government of France, most notably as interim minister of foreign affairs for two weeks in the spring of 1973. He also served as president of the regional council of Haute-Normandie from 1974 to 1981. In addition, he was the mayor of Saint-Maurice-d'Etelan from 1965 to 1989.

Controversy
In his youth, Bettencourt was a member of La Cagoule (The Hood), a violent French fascist-leaning and anti-communist group. Eugène Schueller, founder of L'Oréal, provided financial support and held meetings for La Cagoule at the company's headquarters. In the 1990s, Jean Frydman, a shareholder and board member of L'Oréal's film and television subsidiary Paravision, alleged that he had been sacked in 1989 as the senior management at L'Oréal sought to avoid an Arab boycott of firms with Jewish links. Frydman held joint French and Israeli citizenship. Frydman also turned up the fact that Bettencourt had written several articles for a Nazi propaganda organ during World War II. From 1940 to 1942, Bettencourt wrote more than 60 articles for La Terre Française, a newspaper that flourished with Nazi German financing during the occupation of France. In a special Easter issue in 1941, he described Jews as 'hypocritical Pharisees' whose 'race has been forever sullied by the blood of the righteous. They will be cursed'. Bettencourt attempted to dismiss the journalism as "errors of youth", claiming that his judgement was clouded by the propaganda of Vichy France. "I have repeatedly expressed my regrets concerning them in public and will always beg the Jewish community to forgive me for them".

Honors
He was elected a member of the Académie des beaux-arts, one of the five academies of the Institut de France, as an unattached member on 23 March 1988.

Family
In 1950, Bettencourt married Liliane, daughter of Eugène Schueller, the founder of L'Oréal, a leading cosmetics company. They had one daughter, Françoise Bettencourt Meyers, who is a member of L'Oréal's board of directors. Françoise Meyers is married to Jean-Pierre Meyers (*1948), who lost all his grandparents in Auschwitz concentration camp.

Bettencourt died on 19 November 2007 at the age of 88.

See also
Jacques Corrèze

References

Michael Bar-Zohar, Bitter Scent: The Case of L'Oréal, Nazis, and the Arab Boycott, Dutton Books, London, 1996, pp. 264.

External links
Biography (in French)
Official website of L'Oréal
Forbes article on L'Oréal
Forbes article on Liliane Bettencourt
Book Review of Bitter Scent

1919 births
2007 deaths
People from Seine-Maritime
Andre
Politicians from Normandy
National Centre of Independents and Peasants politicians
Independent Republicans politicians
French Foreign Ministers
French Ministers of Culture
French Ministers of Posts, Telegraphs, and Telephones
Deputies of the 1st National Assembly of the French Fifth Republic
Deputies of the 2nd National Assembly of the French Fifth Republic
Deputies of the 3rd National Assembly of the French Fifth Republic
Deputies of the 4th National Assembly of the French Fifth Republic
Deputies of the 5th National Assembly of the French Fifth Republic
French Senators of the Fifth Republic
Senators of Seine-Maritime
French fascists
French cosmetics businesspeople
L'Oréal people
Members of the Académie des beaux-arts
Chevaliers of the Légion d'honneur
Recipients of the Croix de Guerre (France)